Ernesto Luis Schiffrin   is an Argentinian-Canadian physician and researcher specialized in cardiovascular diseases.

Schiffrin is a distinguished James McGill Professor of Medicine at the Department of Medicine, McGill University
. Canada Research Chair in Hypertension and Vascular Research at the Lady Davis Institute, and Physician-in-Chief at Jewish General Hospital.

He is known in the cardiovascular research community for his contributions to the understanding of the role of angiotensin II, aldosterone and endothelin hormones in the remodeling mechanisms of small resistance arteries
.

References

External links

Living people
Academic staff of McGill University
University of Buenos Aires alumni
McGill University alumni
21st-century Canadian scientists
Year of birth missing (living people)
21st-century Canadian physicians

Members of the Order of Canada
Fellows of the Royal College of Physicians and Surgeons of Canada
Fellows of the American College of Physicians
Fellows of the American Heart Association
Canadian cardiologists
Canadian medical academics
Canadian medical researchers